Akontio is a subdivision of the municipality of Livadeia, Greece.

Nearest places
Davleia, 18 km
Tithorea, 22 km
Chaeronea, 4 km
Livadeia, 18 km
Arachova, 50 km
Delfoi, 60 km
Lamia, 85 km

Population

See also
List of settlements in Boeotia

References

Populated places in Boeotia